Jana Plotnikova is Lithuanian female acrobatics gymnast. She competed in pair with Sergejus Jeriomkinas.

Plotnikova started acrobatics at the Visaginas Acrobatics Sports School.

In 1992 pair won silver in European championships, bronze in world championships and qualified for the World Games. In 1993 World Games Plotnikova/Jeriomkinas won silver in mixed pairs tempo event.

References 

Year of birth missing (living people)
Living people
Lithuanian acrobatic gymnasts
Female acrobatic gymnasts
People from Visaginas
World Games silver medalists
Competitors at the 1993 World Games
Medalists at the Acrobatic Gymnastics World Championships